Jerry Dodgion (August 29, 1932 – February 17, 2023) was an American jazz saxophonist and flautist.

Dodgion was born in Richmond, California. He played alto sax in middle school and began working locally in the San Francisco area in the 1950s. He played in bands with Rudy Salvini, John Coppola/Chuck Travis and Gerald Wilson and worked with the Vernon Alley Quartet, who accompanied Billie Holiday in 1955. He played with Gerald Wilson from 1953 to 1955, Benny Carter in the 1950s, Red Norvo from 1958 to 1961, Benny Goodman (for his 1962 tour of the Soviet Union), Oliver Nelson, Thad Jones and Mel Lewis (from 1965-1979), Herbie Hancock, Duke Pearson, Blue Mitchell, Count Basie, and Marian McPartland. Dodgion was married to drummer/singer Dottie Dodgion for 20 years.

Dodgion had a long career as a sideman, recording up to 2004 only two dates as leader or co-leader: two tracks in 1955 for Fantasy Records with Sonny Clark on piano and an album in 1958 for World Pacific with Charlie Mariano. Dodgion's first true release as a bandleader was issued in 2004 with an ensemble called The Joy of Sax, featuring saxophonists Frank Wess, Brad Leali, Dan Block and Jay Brandford, pianist Mike LeDonne, bassist Dennis Irwin and percussionist Joe Farnsworth.

Dodgion died from complications of an infection in Queens, New York, on February 17, 2023, at the age of 90.

Discography

As leader
Modern Music From San Francisco (Fantasy, 1955) – 2 tracks on shared album; 2 more tracks featuring Dodgion led by Vince Guaraldi
Beauties Of 1918/Something for Both Ears (World Pacific, 1957 [1958]) – co-led with Charlie Mariano

As sideman
With Louis Armstrong
Louis Armstrong and His Friends (Flying Dutchman/Amsterdam, 1970)
With the Count Basie Orchestra
Hollywood...Basie's Way (Command, 1967)
High Voltage (MPS, 1970)
With Randy Brecker
Score (Solid State, 1969)
With Donald Byrd
Electric Byrd (Blue Note, 1970)
With Ron Carter
Parade (Milestone, 1979)
With Al Cohn
Jazz Mission to Moscow (Colpix, 1962)
With Tadd Dameron
The Magic Touch  (Riverside, 1962)
With Richard Davis
Muses for Richard Davis (MPS, 1969)
With Lou Donaldson
Lush Life (Blue Note, 1967)
With Benny Green
The Place To Be (Blue Note, 1994)
With Bobby Hackett
Creole Cookin' (Verve, 1967)
With Johnny Hammond
The Prophet (Kudu, 1972)
With Herbie Hancock
Speak Like a Child (Blue Note, 1968)
With Antônio Carlos Jobim
Stone Flower (CTI, 1970)
Tide (MCA, 1972)
Matita Perê (A&M, 1970)
With J. J. Johnson
J.J.! (RCA Victor, 1964)
With Etta Jones
From the Heart (Prestige, 1962)
With Quincy Jones
I/We Had a Ball (Limelight, 1965)
With The Thad Jones/ Mel Lewis Orchestra
All My Yesterdays (Resonance, 1966)
Presenting Thad Jones/Mel Lewis and the Jazz Orchestra (Solid State, 1966)
Presenting Joe Williams and Thad Jones/Mel Lewis, the Jazz Orchestra (Solid State, 1966)
Live at the Village Vanguard  (Solid State, 1967)
Monday Night (Solid State, 1968)
Central Park North (Solid State, 1969)
Basle, 1969 (TCB Music, 1969)
Consummation (Solid State/Blue Note, 1969)
Live in Tokyo (Denon Jazz, 1974)
Potpourri (Philadelphia International, 1974)
Thad Jones/Mel Lewis and Manuel De Sica and the Jazz Orchestra (PAUSA, 1974)
Suite for Pops (A&M Horizon, 1975)
New Life (A&M Horizon, 1976)
Thad Jones/Mel Lewis Orchestra With Rhoda Scott (Barclay, 1976)
Live in Munich (A&M Horizon, 1976)
It Only Happens Every Time (EMI/Inner City, 1977)
With Yusef Lateef
Part of the Search (Atlantic, 1973)
In a Temple Garden (CTI, 1979)
With Herbie Mann
My Kinda Groove (Atlantic, 1965)
Our Mann Flute (Atlantic, 1966)
With Marian McPartland
Portrait of Marian McPartland (Concord, 1980)
With Blue Mitchell
Boss Horn (Blue Note, 1966)
Heads Up! (album) (Blue Note, 1967)
With Wes Montgomery
Goin' Out of My Head (Verve, 1966)
With Oliver Nelson
Happenings with Hank Jones (Impulse!, 1966)
Encyclopedia of Jazz (Verve, 1966)
The Sound of Feeling (Verve, 1966)
The Spirit of '67 with Pee Wee Russell (Impulse!, 1967)
With David "Fathead" Newman
Scratch My Back (Prestige, 1979)
With Chico O'Farrill
Nine Flags (Impulse!, 1966)
With Jimmy Owens
Headin' Home (A&M/Horizon, 1978)
With Duke Pearson
The Right Touch (Blue Note, 1966)
Introducing Duke Pearson's Big Band (Blue Note, 1967)
The Phantom (Blue Note, 1968)
Now Hear This (Blue Note, 1969)
I Don't Care Who Knows It (Blue Note, 1970)
It Could Only Happen with You (Blue Note, 1970)
With Lalo Schifrin
Black Widow (CTI, 1976) 
With Shirley Scott
Roll 'Em: Shirley Scott Plays the Big Bands (Impulse!, 1966)
With Jack Sheldon
Playing for Change (Uptown, 1986 [1997])
With Dinah Shore and Red Norvo
Dinah Sings Some Blues with Red (Capitol, 1960)
With Jimmy Smith
Any Number Can Win (Verve, 1963)
Hoochie Coochie Man (Verve, 1966)
With Jimmy Smith and Wes Montgomery
Jimmy & Wes: The Dynamic Duo (Verve, 1967)
With Dakota Staton
I Want a Country Man (Groove Merchant, 1973)
With Sonny Stitt
I Keep Comin' Back! (Roulette, 1966)
With Cal Tjader
Soul Burst (Verve, 1966)
With Stanley Turrentine
A Bluish Bag (Blue Note, 1967)
Don't Mess with Mister T. (CTI, 1973)
With Grover Washington, Jr.
Mister Magic (Kudu, 1975)
With Gerald Wilson
New York, New Sound (Mack Avenue, 2003)
In My Time (Mack Avenue, 2005)
With Kai Winding
Penny Lane & Time (Verve, 1967)
With Phil Woods
Round Trip (Verve, 1969)

References
Footnotes

General references
[ Jerry Dodgion] at Allmusic

External links

1932 births
2023 deaths
Musicians from Richmond, California
American jazz saxophonists
American male saxophonists
Jazz musicians from California
21st-century American saxophonists
21st-century American male musicians
American male jazz musicians
The Thad Jones/Mel Lewis Orchestra members